Paul Dal(e)y may refer to:

Sports
Paul Daly (lawn bowls) (born 1972), Northern Irish lawn bowler
Paul Daley (born 1983), mixed martial artist
Paul Daley (rugby league), from List of Halifax R.L.F.C. players
Paul Daley (footballer) from 1983 FIFA World Youth Championship squads

Others
Paul Daly (sculptor), Irish sculptor
Paul Daly (politician), Irish politician
Paul Daley (musician), musician with Leftfield
Paul Daly (actor) from The 14

See also
Paul Dailey Jr. (1915–1990), member of the Wisconsin State Assembly
Paul Dailly (born 1971), Scottish-Canadian soccer player and coach